Girar is the first studio album released by the Dominican based electronic rock band Tabu Tek. This first production was released on the year 1996 in Santo Domingo, Dominican Republic. The released spanned several hits in the local rock scene of Santo Domingo including the songs "Cierra Los Ojos" , "Escena Gastada", and "Girar" who all received significant airplay in local rock stations like X-102 and 95.7 Nota Diferente. Despite this local success, the band enjoyed little recognition outside Santo Domingo, even less outside the Dominican Republic. Led by Maximo Martinez, the success of this album led the band to produce two more albums.

Track listing

Instintos
Girar
Cierra los Ojos
Soledad
Escena Gastada
Cuando Estas A mi Lado
Acepta Lo Que Eres
Poema A mi Alma
El Juego
Si Por Razon...
Si Tu No Estas
Girar (remix)

1996 albums